Gernot Böhme (3 January 1937 – 20 January 2022) was a German philosopher and author, contributing to the philosophy of science, theory of time, aesthetics, ethics, and philosophical anthropology. He is the main pioneer of German ecocriticism, the study of the relationship between culture and the environment. He has been the director of the Institute for Practical Philosophy in Darmstadt, Hesse, since 2005. Despite being one of Germany's most acclaimed public intellectuals, very little of his work has so far been translated into English.

Biography
Böhme was born in Dessau, Anhalt, Germany. He studied mathematics, physics, and philosophy at the University of Göttingen and at the Hamburg University, and completed a PhD in 1965 at Hamburg University. As a research scientist he worked at the Max-Planck-Institute with Carl Friedrich von Weizsäcker. From 1977 to 2002 he was Professor of Philosophy at Technical University of Darmstadt. He died on 20 January 2022, at the age of 85.

Books
 German
1974 Zeit und Zahl. Vittorio Klosterman. Frankfurt am Main
1995 Atmosphäre: Essays zur neuen Ästhetik. Frankfurt am Main
1999 Theorie des Bildes. Fink, München
2001 Aisthetik. Vorlesungen über Ästhetik als allgemeine Wahrnehmungslehre, Fink
2002 Die Natur vor uns. Naturphilosophie in pragmatischer Hinsicht. Kusterdingen
2003 Der Typ Sokrates, Suhrkamp
2005 Goethes Faust als philosophischer Text. Die Graue Edition, Kusterdingen
2006 Architektur und Atmosphäre. München
2008 Invasive Technisierung. Technikphilosophie und Technikkritik. Kusterdingen
2008 Ethik leiblicher Existenz. Über unseren moralischen Umgang mit der eigenen Natur. Suhrkamp, Frankfurt am Main

 English translations
2001 Ethics in Context: The Art of Dealing with Serious Questions, Polity
2012 Invasive Technification: Critical Essays in the Philosophy of Technology, Continuum
2017 Atmospheric Architectures: The Aesthetics of Felt Spaces, Bloomsbury
2017 Critique of Aesthetic Capitalism, Mimesis

References

1937 births
2022 deaths
20th-century German philosophers
21st-century German philosophers
Philosophers of science
Philosophers of art
German ethicists
German male writers
Academic staff of Technische Universität Darmstadt
People from Dessau-Roßlau
University of Hamburg alumni